The New Hampshire House of Representatives is the lower house in the New Hampshire General Court, the bicameral legislature of the state of New Hampshire. The House of Representatives consists of 400 members coming from 204 legislative districts across the state, created from divisions of the state's counties. On average, each legislator represents about 3,300 residents, which is the smallest lower house representative-to-population ratio in the country.

New Hampshire has by far the largest lower house of any American state; the second-largest, the Pennsylvania House of Representatives, has 203 members. The House is the fourth-largest lower house in the English-speaking world (behind the 435-member United States House of Representatives, 543-member Lok Sabha of India, and 650-member House of Commons of the United Kingdom).

Districts vary in number of seats based on their populations, with the least-populous districts electing only one member and the most populous electing 11. In multi-member districts, voters are allowed to cast as many votes as there are seats to be filled; for instance, in a two-member district, a voter can vote for up to two candidates. This system of plurality block voting often results in one party winning all of the seats in the district, as the (cross-sectional) results below for the current representation attest. Some municipalities are in multiple districts, including floterial districts, so as to achieve more equal apportionment by population.

Unlike in many state legislatures, there is no single "aisle" to cross per se, as members of both parties sit partially segregated in five sections. The seat section and number is put on the legislator's motor vehicle license plate, which they pay for if they wish to put one on their personal automobiles, or in the case of the chairpersons and party leaders, their title is put on the legislative plate. Seating location is enforced, as seating is pre-assigned. Although the personal preference of the legislator is asked, usually chairmen and those with special needs are given the preferred aisle seats. The sixth section is the Speaker's seat at the head of the hall.

The House of Representatives has met in Representatives Hall of the New Hampshire State House since 1819. Representatives Hall is thus the oldest chamber in the United States still in continuous legislative use. Large arched windows line the walls. On the rostrum hang portraits of John P. Hale, Abraham Lincoln, George Washington, Franklin Pierce, and Daniel Webster.

Composition

Leadership

The current leadership of the house is as follows:

Committees
The current committee leadership in the New Hampshire House of Representatives is listed below.

The chair is the presiding officer of the committee, responsible for leading hearings, maintaining order, and enforcing committee rules. In the absence of the chair, the vice chair becomes presiding officer for the hearing. The clerk is responsible for all administrative matters for the committee, including attendance, minutes, and recording votes. The ranking member is the chief representative of the minority party on the committee, and is traditionally appointed chair when the majority changes hands. Chairs and vice chairs are appointed by and serve at the pleasure of the speaker, while ranking members are appointed by the speaker on recommendation of the minority leader. The committee clerk is selected by the committee chair. The speaker can unilaterally remove or reassign any committee member, chair, vice chair or clerk.

Members, 2022–2024

Belknap

Carroll

Cheshire

Coös

Grafton

Hillsborough

↑ Member was first elected in a special election.
↓ If a candidate receives enough votes in two parties' primaries, they are listed as being the nominee of both parties in the general election.

Merrimack

↑ Member was first elected in a special election.

Rockingham

↑ Member was first elected in a special election.

Strafford

↑ Member was first elected in a special election.
↓ If a candidate receives enough votes in two parties' primaries, they are listed as being the nominee of both parties in the general election.

Sullivan

↑ Member was originally elected in a special election.

Past composition of the House of Representatives

Notes

References

External links
 State of New Hampshire House of Representatives official government website
 Leadership
 Project Vote Smart – State House of New Hampshire voter information
 The Legislative Branch of State Government

 
General Court
State lower houses in the United States
1784 establishments in New Hampshire